Ficus fistulosa is an Asian species of fig tree in the family Moraceae.
No subspecies are listed in the Catalogue of Life; its native range is Assam to Taiwan, Indo-China, Malesia and New Guinea.  The species can be found in Vietnam: where it may be called sung giòn. It is dioecious, with male and female flowers produced on separate individuals.

References

External links 
 

fistulosa
Trees of Vietnam
Flora of Indo-China
Flora of Malesia
Plants described in 1825
Dioecious plants